The Damascus offensive (2013) refers to a series of rebel operations that began in early February 2013 in and around the city of Damascus.

History 

On 6 February, rebel forces launched an offensive, named "Battle of Armageddon", on the edge of Central Damascus, with rebels entering the Jobar District of Damascus after overrunning a Syrian Army roadblock. Parts of the Damascus ring road which acts as a barrier between Central Damascus and Ghouta were also seized by rebel fighters. Rebels have also launched attacks on Adra, north east of Damascus.

On 10 February, a rebel claimed that opposition forces had captured another military checkpoint in the Jobar district. However, Syrian Observatory for Human Rights stated that while fighting for the highway continued, government troops regained control of the area after bombing rebel positions the day before.

On 19 February, rebels began moving truckloads of anti aircraft weapons into Jobar in an effort to consolidate advances made in the Eastern Damascus district.

On 20 February, a SCUD missile, fired by government forces, hit the command center of the Islamist militia Liwa Al-Islam near Douma, which had been spearheading the attack against the roundabout and the Jobar district. Sheikh Zahran Alloush, the commander and founder of the brigade, had been wounded in the strike. The area was devastated and other rebel fighters were also killed or wounded.

On 21 February, rebels launched 3 car bombings on security targets in the Barzeh neighbourhood in Damascus. Also fired several mortar rounds at the Syrian army's general staff headquarters in Umayyad Square, as well as other streets and squares known to house government and security offices, according to residents and activists. SOHR claimed that 22 people, mostly soldiers, were killed in these other attacks.

On 27 February, SOHR claimed that rebels had fired several mortar shells which exploded in the military Judiciary and literature department of the University of Damascus.

On 2 March, heavy fighting was reported in Darayya between rebels and the Syrian Army. The Local Coordination Committees of Syria claimed that rebels targeted a military column attempting to storm Darayya, and also defended several attempts by the government to storm Jobar.

On 3 March, rebels reportedly fired several rockets at security forces headquarters in Damascus, though it is unknown if there were any casualties.

On 12 March, 30 military deserters were killed in an Army ambush near Damascus while they were heading towards the rebel-held Eastern Ghouta area.

On 18 March, rebels operating within Damascus launched mortar bombs at the Damascus Presidential Palace, though its unclear if there were any casualties.

On 21 March, an explosion in the Iman Mosque in Al-Mazraa district killed as much as 41 people, including Sunni cleric, Sheikh Mohammed al-Buti. Al-Buti was one of the most prominent supporters of the Syrian government from the Sunni branch of Islam in Syria. Syrian State TV claimed the explosion was a suicide bombing, though some residents claim it was caused by a mortar bomb that struck a nearby political office.

On 25 March, rebels launched one of their heaviest bombardments of Central Damascus since the revolt began, with mortars reportedly hitting Umayyad Square, where Baath Party headquarters, Air Force Intelligence and state television are also located. The attack was launched when rebel forces advanced into the Kafr Souseh district of Damascus, and the Syrian Army retaliated with artillery launched from Mount Qasioun.

References

Damascus in the Syrian civil war
Military operations of the Syrian civil war in 2013
Military operations of the Syrian civil war involving the Free Syrian Army
Military operations of the Syrian civil war involving the al-Nusra Front
Military operations of the Syrian civil war involving the Syrian government
Military operations of the Syrian civil war involving Hezbollah
February 2013 events in Syria
March 2013 events in Syria